Nicholas of Ilok (Hungarian: Újlaki Miklós, Bosnian and Croatian: Nikola Iločki, ; 1410–1477) was a Hungarian nobleman,  Ban of Croatia, Slavonia, Dalmatia and Macsó, Voivode of Transylvania and titular King of Bosnia from 1471 until his death.

A member of the Újlaki family, he was one of the richest landowners in the Kingdom of Hungary and one of its most influential magnates. He held a reputation of a great hero and served under four kings of Hungary: Albert, Vladislaus I, Ladislaus V and Matthias I.

Early career
His parents were Ladislaus of Ilok, Ban of Macsó, and Anna Stiboriczi, daughter of Stibor of Stiboricz, Voivode of Transylvania. His father died shortly after his birth. He had four brothers: John, Stephen, Peter and Paul. His great-grandfather, Nicholas Kont, served as palatine to King Louis I of Hungary. Nicholas was the best known lord of the city of Ilok. While he was in power, the city experienced its golden age. In 1430, Nicholas' brother Stephen died and Nicholas succeeded him as Ban of Macsó.

When King Albert died in 1439, Nicholas supported his widow, Elizabeth of Luxembourg, in her struggle to secure the Holy Crown of Hungary for her son, Ladislaus the Posthumous. As a reward, Queen Elizabeth had him knighted. However, Nicholas soon took the side of Vladislaus III of Poland and allied himself with John Hunyadi. Upon becoming King of Hungary, Vladislaus gave Nicholas and Hunyadi extraordinary powers, appointing them as joint Voivodes of Transylvania.

Matthias' reign 

In 1457, Nicholas took part in the liquidation of John Hunyadi's son, Ladislaus. The next year, Ladislaus' brother, Matthias Corvinus, was elected King of Hungary. However, various Hungarian and Croatian nobles refused to recognise him as their sovereign. The opposition was led by Nicholas himself and Palatine Ladislaus II Garay, who asked Holy Roman Emperor Frederick III for support. Matthias was, however, eventually recognised as king.

He retained his influence throughout the reign of Matthias Corvinus, who created him perpetual ispán of Teočak in 1464, making him only the third person to bear such a title. In 1471, having settled his disputes with Nicholas, King Matthias I conferred upon him the title of King of Bosnia. He was crowned king in 1472 in the fortress of Jajce. Nicholas seems to have been made Ban of Croatia, Slavonia and Dalmatia by early 1472, probably in order to secure his loyalty to the King and to enable him to defend the region against the Ottomans. He had been named ban to replace Blaise Magyar, who had rebelled against the King. However, he did not retain that office for long; by the end of the same year, he was replaced by Damian Horvat.

As King of Bosnia, Nicholas even minted his own currency. However, Nicholas failed to defend his satellite kingdom, losing most of it to the Ottomans. The Hungarian Kingdom of Bosnia consisted of a few fortresses. Nicholas ruled those remnants and retained the kingly title until his death, styling himself "Nicholas, by the Grace of God King of Bosnia" (Latin: Nicolaus Dei Gratia Rex Bosniae). He was succeeded, as Ban of Macsó and Lord of Ilok, by his eldest surviving son, Laurence.

Marriages and issue 

Nicholas was first married to Margit Rozgonyi (fl 1441-1458). By his first wife, Nicholas had the following children:

Nicholas (fl 1452)
Stephen (fl 1459-1465)
Catherine (fl. 1448-1493), whose daughter's sons claimed their great-grandfather's inheritance
Euphrosyne (fl. 1458-1476)
Hieronyma (fl 1458-1460), married to Leonhard of Gorizia
Ursula (fl 1458-1476)

He was married secondly to Dorottya Széchy de Felsőlendva (fl 1471-1495). Their children were:

Laurence (1459–1524), Nicholas' successor, after whose death without surviving issue the family became extinct
Bernard (fl 1460)

References

External links
Nicholas of Ilok, Ban of Croatia, built the castle in Ilok in the 15th century
Nicholas of Ilok's kingship in Bosnia 1471-1477

|-

|-

|-

|-

|-

Nicholas
Bans of Croatia
15th-century Croatian nobility
1410 births
1477 deaths
15th-century Croatian people
15th-century Hungarian nobility
Bans of Macsó
Counts of the Székelys
Ujlaki, Nicholas
Pretenders to the Bosnian throne
Bans of Slavonia